Allegheny West is the name of two places in the United States:

 Allegheny West, Philadelphia, a neighborhood in Philadelphia, Pennsylvania
 Allegheny West (Pittsburgh), a neighborhood in Pittsburgh, Pennsylvania